École/Collège régional Gabrielle-Roy, built in 1984, is a French-language high school in Île-des-Chênes, Manitoba, Canada. It gathers students from the communities of Île-des-Chênes, Lorette, St. Norbert, La Salle, St. Adolphe, Ste. Agathe, Dufresne, Niverville, Grande Pointe and Ste. Genevieve. The E/CRGR forces itself to be the prolongation of the Franco-Manitoban family by making French language first, therefore immersing the students in their culture and making it an active part of their daily lives. 

The school is named after Gabrielle Roy, a Canadian author.

External links
École/Collège Gabrielle-Roy Official site.

High schools in Manitoba
Educational institutions established in 1984
French-language schools in Manitoba
1984 establishments in Manitoba